The Guessing Game is the ninth full-length album by the British doom metal band Cathedral. It was released on 26 March 2010. It is the first double-album from the band.

It was voted the eighth best album of the year in the Metal Hammer magazine critics poll of 2010.

Reception
Describing the album as Cathedral's "magnum opus", Phil Freeman wrote for AllMusic that The Guessing Game offered the "most psychedelic, progressive material in the band's entire catalog".  Writing in The Guardian, Jamie Thomson praised the "fine balance between their monolithic guitar groove and a more heady blend of prog, folk, psychedelia and even the occasional burst of Bonzo Dog Band-style jazz whimsy...these sparkling sojourns to the outer fringes of 70s rock would cheer even the most jaded metaller. Doom has rarely sounded so joyous". Viewing The Guessing Game as embodying an "unprecedented level of indulgence", The Quietus' Noel Gardner suggested that it serves as "a landmark Cathedral release" and "an ideal starting point to ease a Cathedral ignoramus into the band's self-contained world".  Noting the frequency with which the double-album format suffers from bloat, Invisible Oranges' Chris Rowella praised Cathedral for coming "damned...close" to perfecting the model.  Describing The Guessing Game as Cathedral's "pinnacle of...experimentation", Popmatters' Chris Colgan suggested that the album provides insight into Cathedral's diverse influences.

However, not all critics wrote favourably about the album.  George Pacheco wrote for About.com that The Guessing Game is a "confounding conundrum of an album...both forward-thinking and stagnant-sounding at the same time". Pacheco identified "an overwrought sense of daring" as a key concern, which left the album "fractured and flawed".

Track listing
All songs written by Lee Dorrian and Garry Jennings, except where noted.

Disc one
 "Immaculate Misconception" (Leo Smee) – 2:24
 "Funeral of Dreams" – 8:28
 "Painting in the Dark" – 6:18
 "Death of an Anarchist" – 7:12
 "The Guessing Game" (Jennings) – 3:08
 "Edwige's Eyes" – 7:08
 "Cats, Incense, Candles and Wine" – 6:01

Disc two
 "One Dimensional People" (Smee) – 2:30
 "The Casket Chasers" – 6:41
 "La Noche del Buque Maldito (aka Ghost Ship of the Blind Dead)" (Dorrian, Jennings, Smee) – 5:46
 "The Running Man" (Dorrian) – 8:46
 "Requiem for the Voiceless" – 9:50
 "Journey into Jade" – 10:36
 "Journey into Jade" ends at 6:32 and continues with silence until 9:32. At this point,  begins an untitled hidden track: there is a voice recording of Cathedral artist Dave Patchett describing the theme of the artwork for The Guessing Game. At one point during this audio section, Lee Dorrian stifles a laugh in response to one of Dave's opinions about religion. There is music playing in the background.

Credits
 Lee Dorrian – vocals, samples
 Garry Jennings – guitar, acoustic guitar, percussion
 Brian Dixon – drums, percussion
 Leo Smee – bass guitar, Mellotron, flute, synthesizers, autoharp
 Dave Patchett – cover art
Warren Riker – production, engineering, mixing
Maor Appelbaum – mastering

References 

2010 albums
Cathedral (band) albums